is a Japanese male artistic gymnast and part of the national team. At the 2013 Summer Universiade in Kazan, Nonomura won the team all-around bronze medal (with Yusuke Tanaka, Hiroki Ishikawa, Ryōhei Katō and Chihiro Yoshioka). He participated at the 2014 World Artistic Gymnastics Championships in   Nanning, China. He won the team all-around gold medal at the 2017 Summer Universiade. Nonomura won the gold medal in the men's all-around competition at the 2018 FIG Artistic Gymnastics World Cup Series in Birmingham, UK in March, 2018.

References

1993 births
Living people
Japanese male artistic gymnasts
Place of birth missing (living people)
Universiade medalists in gymnastics
Gymnasts at the 2018 Asian Games
Medalists at the 2018 Asian Games
Asian Games silver medalists for Japan
Asian Games medalists in gymnastics
Universiade gold medalists for Japan
Universiade silver medalists for Japan
Medalists at the 2013 Summer Universiade
Medalists at the 2015 Summer Universiade
Medalists at the 2017 Summer Universiade
20th-century Japanese people
21st-century Japanese people